Alberto Manguel  (born March 13, 1948, in Buenos Aires) is an Argentine-Canadian anthologist, translator, essayist, novelist, editor, and a former Director of the National Library of Argentina. He is the author of numerous non-fiction books such as The Dictionary of Imaginary Places (co-written with Gianni Guadalupi in 1980), A History of Reading (1996), The Library at Night (2007) and Homer's Iliad and Odyssey: A Biography (2008); and novels such as News From a Foreign Country Came (1991). Though almost all of Manguel's books were written in English, two of his novels (El regreso and Todos los hombres son mentirosos) were written in Spanish, and El regreso has not yet been published in English. Manguel has also written film criticism such as Bride of Frankenstein (1997) and collections of essays such as Into the Looking Glass Wood (1998). In 2007, Manguel was selected to be that year's annual lecturer for the prestigious Massey Lectures. in 2021,  he gave the Roger Lancelyn Green lecture to the Lewis Carroll Society on his love of the 'Alice' stories from Lewis Carroll.

For more than twenty years, Manguel has edited a number of literary anthologies on a variety of themes or genres ranging from erotica and gay stories to fantastic literature and mysteries.

Career
Manguel was born to Pablo and Rosalia Manguel, both Jewish. He spent his first years in Israel where his father Pablo was the Argentine ambassador, returning to his native country at the age of seven. Later, in Buenos Aires, when Manguel was still a teenager, he met the writer Jorge Luis Borges, a customer of the Pygmalion Anglo-German bookshop in Buenos Aires where Manguel worked after school. As Borges was almost blind, he would ask others to read out loud for him, and Manguel became one of Borges' readers, several times a week from 1964 to 1968.

In Buenos Aires, Manguel attended the Colegio Nacional de Buenos Aires from 1961 to 1966; among his teachers were notable Argentinian intellectuals such as the historian Alberto Salas, the Cervantes scholar Isaias Lerner and the literary critic Enrique Pezzoni. Manguel did one year (1967) at the Universidad de Buenos Aires, Filosofía y Letras, but he abandoned his studies and started working at the recently founded Editorial Galerna of Guillermo Schavelzon (who thirty-five years later, now established in Barcelona, was to become Manguel's literary agent). In 1969 Manguel travelled to Europe and worked as a reader for various publishing companies: Denoël, Gallimard and Les Lettres Nouvelles in Paris, and Calder & Boyars in London.

1970s
In 1971, Manguel, living then in Paris and London, was awarded the Premio La Nación (Buenos Aires) for a collection of short stories. The prize was shared with the writer Bernardo Schiavetta. 
In 1972 Manguel returned to Buenos Aires and worked for a year as a reporter for the newspaper La Nación.
In 1974, he was offered employment as foreign editor at the Franco Maria Ricci publishing company in Milan. Here he met Gianni Guadalupi and later, at Guadalupi's suggestion, wrote with him The Dictionary of Imaginary Places. The book is a travel guide to fantasy lands, islands, cities, and other locations from world literature, including Ruritania, Shangri-La, Xanadu, Atlantis, L. Frank Baum's Oz, Lewis Carroll's Wonderland, Thomas More's Utopia, Edwin Abbott's Flatland, C. S. Lewis' Narnia, and the realms of Francois Rabelais, Jonathan Swift, and J.R.R. Tolkien.
In 1976, Manguel moved to Tahiti, where he worked as editor for Les Éditions du Pacifique until 1977. He then worked for the same company in Paris for one year.
In 1978 Manguel settled in Milford, Surrey (England) and set up the short-lived Ram Publishing Company.
In 1979, Manguel returned to Tahiti to work again for Les Éditions du Pacifique, this time until 1982.

1980s–1990s

In 1982 Manguel moved to Toronto, Ontario, Canada and lived there (with a brief European period) until 2000. He has been a Canadian citizen ever since. Here Manguel contributed regularly to The Globe and Mail (Toronto), The Times Literary Supplement (London), The Village Voice (New York), The Washington Post, The Sydney Morning Herald, The Australian Review of Books, The New York Times and Svenska Dagbladet (Stockholm), and reviewed books and plays for the Canadian Broadcasting Corporation. Manguel's early impression of Canada was that it was "...like one of those places whose existence we assume because of a name on a sign above a platform, glimpsed at as our train stops and then rushes on." (from Passages: Welcome Home to Canada (2002), with preface by Rudyard Griffiths). As well, though, Manguel noted that "When I arrived in Canada, for the first time I felt I was living in a place where I could participate actively as a writer in the running of the state."

In 1983, he selected the stories for what is perhaps his best-known anthology Black Water: The Book of Fantastic Literature. His first novel, "News From a Foreign Country Came", won the McKitterick Prize in 1992.

In 1997, Manguel translated into English The Anatomist, first novel of the Argentine writer Federico Andahazi.

He was appointed as the Distinguished Visiting Writer in the Markin-Flanagan Distinguished Writers Program at the University of Calgary from 1997 to 1999. Manguel was the Opening Lecturer at the "Exile & Migration" Congress, Boston University, in June 1999, and the Times Literary Supplement lecturer in 1997.

2000s

In 2000, Manguel moved to the Poitou-Charentes region of France, where he and his partner purchased and renovated a medieval presbytery. Among the renovations was an oak-panelled library to house Manguel's nearly 40,000 books. In September 2020, the collection was donated to the Centre for Research in the History of Reading in Lisbon, Portugal with Manguel as its head.

Manguel held the Cátedra Cortázar at the Universidad de Guadalajara, Mexico, in 2007 and the S. Fischer Chair at the Freie Universität Berlin, in 2003. In 2007, he received an honorary doctorate from the University of Liège.

Manguel delivered the 2007 Massey Lectures which were later published as The City of Words and in the same year delivered the Northrop Frye-Antonine Maillet Lecture in Moncton, New Brunswick. He was the Pratt Lecturer at Memorial University of Newfoundland, in 2003.

In 2008, the Centre Georges Pompidou in Paris honoured Alberto Manguel as part of its 30th Anniversary Celebrations, by inviting him to set up a three-month long program of lectures, film and round tables.

He writes a regular column for  Geist magazine.

Manguel's book History of Reading was referenced as a source of inspiration to the Book of Sand film.  He suffered a stroke in December 2013, and reflected on the experience in a 2014 op-ed in The New York Times.

In December 2015 he was named director of the National Library in his native Argentina, replacing Horacio González. Manguel held the post from July 2016 to August 2018.

In 2018 he was awarded the Gutenberg Prize of the International Gutenberg Society and the City of Mainz.

Personal life 
He was married to Pauline Ann Brewer from 1975 to 1986, and their children are Alice Emily, Rachel Claire, and Rupert Tobias. Upon divorcing Brewer in 1987, Manguel began seeing his current partner Craig Stephenson. He has been a member of the Roxburghe Club since 2021.

Bibliography

Novels
News from a Foreign Country Came. New York: C. Potter, 1991
Stevenson Under the Palm Trees. 2003. 
El regreso (A Return). 2005. 
Un amant très vétilleux (The Overdiscriminating Lover). 2005, 
Todos los hombres son mentirosos (All Men Are Liars). 2008.

Anthologies
Black Water: The Book of Fantastic Literature, ed. Alberto Manguel. New York: C.N. Potter, 1983
Dark Arrows: Chronicles of Revenge (1985, anthology) 
Other Fires: Short Fiction by Latin American Women (1986, anthology) 
Evening Games: Chronicles of Parents and Children (1986, anthology) 
Chronicles of Marriage (1988, anthology) 
The Oxford Book of Canadian Ghost Stories (1990, anthology) 
Black Water 2: More Tales of the Fantastic (1990, anthology) 
Soho Square III (1990, anthology) 
Seasons (1990, anthology) 
White Fire: Further Fantastic Literature (1990, anthology) 
Canadian Mystery Stories (1991, anthology) 
The Gates of Paradise: The Anthology of Erotic Short Literature (1993, anthology) 
Meanwhile, In Another Part of the Forest: Gay Stories from Alice Munro to Yukio Mishima (1994, anthology) 
The Second Gates of Paradise: The Anthology of Erotic Short Literature (1994, anthology) 
Lost Words (1996, anthology), 
By the Light of the Glow-worm Lamp: Three Centuries of Reflections on Nature (1998, anthology) 
Mothers & Daughters (1998, anthology) 
Fathers & Sons (1998, anthology) 
The Ark in the Garden: Fables for Our Times (1998, anthology) 
God's Spies: Stories in Defiance of Oppression (1999, anthology) 
The Penguin Book of Christmas Stories (2005, anthology) 
The Penguin Book of Summer Stories (2007, anthology)

Non-fiction
The Dictionary of Imaginary Places, ed. Manguel, Alberto & Guadalupi, Gianni. New York: Macmillan, 1980
A History of Reading (1996) 
Bride of Frankenstein (1997, film criticism) 
Into the Looking Glass Wood (1998, essays) 
A Visit to the Dream Bookseller / Ein Besuch beim Traumbuchhändler (1998)
Reading Pictures: A History of Love and Hate (2000, art criticism) 
Kipling: A Brief Biography for Young Adults (2000), 
Comment Pinocchio apprit à lire (How Pinocchio Learned to Read, 2000) 
A Reading Diary (2004) 
With Borges (2004, biography), 
The Library at Night (2006) 
Nuevo elogio de la locura (At the Mad Hatter's Table, 2006) 
Magic Land of Toys (2006) 
The City of Words (CBC Massey Lecture) (2007) 
Homer's The Iliad and The Odyssey: A Biography. (2007, history and criticism) 
A Reader on Reading Yale University Press, 2010 
The Traveler, the Tower, and the Worm: the Reader as Metaphor, 2013 
Curiosity. New Haven, Conn.: Yale University Press, 2015
Packing My Library. Yale University Press, 2018

Critical studies and reviews
 Boyd Tonkin, The Spirit of the Shelves (The Independent, London, April 25, 2008)
 Italo Calvino, The Book of Sand (Article on The Dictionary of Imaginary Places)
 Georges Steiner, reviews of History of Reading and Into the Looking-Glass Wood (The New Yorker)
 P.D. James, review of History of Reading (Sunday Times)
 Jeanette Winterson, review of Reading Pictures (The Times Literary Supplement)
 Peter Conrad, review of The Library at Night
 Peter Ackroyd, review of The Library at Night
 Hector Bianciotti, Une passion en toutes lettres (Gallimard, 2001) (Essay on Manguel)
 Peter Kemp, The Oxford Book of Literary Quotations (Oxford University Press, 1997)
 Review of Curiosity.

Prizes and awards
 Gutenberg Prize of the International Gutenberg Society and the City of Mainz (Germany, 2018)
Prix Formentor (Spain, 2017)
 Medalla al Mérito (Buenos Aires, 2007)
 Milovan Vidakovic Literary Award (Novi Sad, Serbia, 2007)
 Premio Grinzane Cavour, essay for Diario di un lettore (Italy, 2007)
 Doctor Honoris Causa, University of Liège (Belgium, 2007)
 Prix Roger Caillois (France, 2004)
 Fellow of the S. Fischer Stiftung (Germany, 2004–2005)
 Officier de l'Ordre des Arts et des Lettres (France, 2004)
 Fellow of the Simon Guggenheim Foundation (USA, 2004)
 Prix Poitou-Charentes for Chez Borges (France, 2004)
 Premio Germán Sánchez Ruipérez for best literary criticism (Spain, 2002)
 Prix France Culture (Étranger), for Dans la forêt du miroir (France, 2001)
 Prix Médicis Essai, for Une Histoire de la lecture (France, 1998)
 Chevalier de l'Ordre des Arts et des Lettres (France, 1996)
 Harbourfront Award for Contribution to the Arts (Canada, 1992)
 Canadian Writers' Association Award, fiction (Canada, 1992)
 McKitterick First Novel Award (UK, 1992)
 Lewis Gallantière Translation Prize (honourable mention), American Translators Association (USA, 1986)
 German Critics Award for Von Atlantis bis Utopia, German translation of The Dictionary of Imaginary Places (Germany, 1981)
 Literary Award La Nación for short stories (Buenos Aires, 1971)

See also
2015 in literature

References

External links

 manguel.com Official website
 NYT article by Alberto Manguel on his personal library
Alberto Manguel at Geist.com
Alberto Manguel interviewed about his new book "A Reader on Reading".
 Alberto Manguel Papers, Thomas Fisher Rare Book Library

1948 births
People from Buenos Aires
Prix Médicis essai winners
Harbourfront Festival Prize winners
Argentine emigrants to Canada
Argentine male writers
Argentine translators
Canadian translators
Canadian male novelists
Canadian literary critics
Canadian gay writers
Living people
Canadian anthologists
Prix Roger Caillois recipients
Canadian book editors
Fellows of the Royal Society of Literature
Canadian LGBT novelists
Officers of the Order of Canada
Canadian male non-fiction writers
21st-century Canadian LGBT people
Academic staff of the Collège de France
Gay novelists